Arjuni-Morgaon is a taluka in Arjuni Morgaon Subdivision in Maharashtra, India.

References

Gondia district
Talukas in Maharashtra